William K. Dickson may refer to:

William Kennedy Dickson (1860–1935), French-Anglo-Scottish inventor 
William K. Dickson, author of The Jacobite Attempt of 1719 published in 1895